Rui Manuel Magalhães Casaca (born 18 October 1959) is a Portuguese former professional footballer who played as a central midfielder, and is the director of football at S.C. Braga.

Football career
Born in Marco de Canaveses, Porto District, Casaca started playing in the lower leagues with Merelinense F.C. and C.A. Valdevez, helping the latter team promote to the Segunda Liga in 1981. Starting in the following year and until his retirement, he competed solely in the Primeira Liga, with Rio Ave F.C. and Boavista FC.

In the 1985–86 season, Casaca scored a career-best four goals from 28 appearances to help Boavista finish in fifth position, with the subsequent qualification to the UEFA Cup. He retired in June 1994 at the age of 34, amassing top division totals of 305 matches and 18 goals, and immediately joined his main club's coaching staff; in January 1997 he was named interim manager, collecting one point in his two games in charge.

From 1997 to 2006, Casaca acted as director of football of Boavista and C.F. Os Belenenses, also being assistant to manager Manuel José at both sides. On 31 July 2007, in the same capacity, he returned to S.C. Braga where he had already occupied the position, and went on to remain there for several years.

Honours

Player
Boavista
Taça de Portugal: 1991–92
Supertaça Cândido de Oliveira: 1992

References

External links

1959 births
Living people
People from Marco de Canaveses
Portuguese footballers
Association football midfielders
Primeira Liga players
Liga Portugal 2 players
Merelinense F.C. players
Rio Ave F.C. players
Boavista F.C. players
Portuguese football managers
Primeira Liga managers
Boavista F.C. managers
Sportspeople from Porto District